Amanda Ford may refer to:

Amanda Ford (rugby union) (born 1970), New Zealand rugby union player
Mandy Ford (born 1961), British Anglican priest